Like Basie!, (also released as Like Who? and Paul Quinichette), is an album by American jazz saxophonist Paul Quinichette featuring tracks recorded in 1959 and released on the United Artists label.

Reception

Allmusic awarded the album 4½ stars and reviewer Scott Yanow stated, "This set features the tenor-saxophonist with Count Basie sidemen both past and present ... Quinichette might have been derivative but he always showed enthusiasm and skill in being creative within the Lester Young approach and this is a fine and formerly obscure effort". On All About Jazz, Nic Jones wrote "Quinichette's allegiance to all things Basie cannot be denied".

Track listing
 "Jump the Blues Away" (Ed Lewis) – 5:34	
 "Jump for Me" (Count Basie) – 6:40	
 "Like Basie" (Nat Pierce) – 5:48	
 "The Holy Main" (Pierce, Gene Roland) – 8:01	
 "Big D" (Pierce, Roland) – 3:57	
 "P.Q." (Paul Quinichette) – 5:40

Personnel 
Paul Quinichette – tenor saxophone
Harry Edison, Snooky Young, Dick Vance, Shad Collins – trumpet
Al Grey – trombone
Nat Pierce – piano
Freddie Green – guitar
Eddie Jones – bass
Jo Jones – drums

References 

1959 albums
Paul Quinichette albums
United Artists Records albums